The Occitan cross (also called cross of Occitania, cross of Languedoc, cross of Toulouse; heraldically cross cleché, pommetty and voided) is a heraldic cross, today chiefly used as a symbol of Occitania. 

The design was probably first used  in the coat of arms of the counts of Forcalquier (in modern Provence), in the 12th century, and by the counts of Toulouse in their capacity as Marquises of Provence, on 13th century coins and seals. 
It later spread to the other provinces of  Occitania, namely Provence, Guyenne, Gascony, Dauphiné, Auvergne and Limousin.

A yellow Occitan cross on a blood-red background with the seven-armed golden star of the Felibritge makes up the flag of modern-day Occitania. It can also be found in the emblems of Midi-Pyrénées, Languedoc-Roussillon and Hautes-Alpes, among many others, as well as in cemeteries and at country crossroads.

The blazon of the modern emblem is gules, a cross cleché (or: pattée) pommettée voided or ("in a red field, a gold cross 'with keys' (or: 'with paws') and 'with spheres/apples', in outline"; Occitan: de golas a la crotz voidada, clechada (or patèa) e pometada d'aur),  also described as cross pattée botonnée, cross pommettée, cross toulouse, or cross fleury voided (or: in skeleton).
In the Chanson de la Croisade Albigeoise, it goes by the name of "Raymondine cross" (crotz ramondenca).

History

The Occitan cross probably first appears in the coat of arms of the counts of Forcalquier and then during the reign of Raymond V, count of Toulouse, as a particular description of his official seal dated from 1165 corroborates.
It soon spreads across the whole south-western part of today's France and is even spotted in various towns up north throughout the 12th century. Several interpretations have been proposed for the cross, often stressing the symbolic side of it and leaving aside the fact that "heraldry is not a science of symbols, but one of emblems" (M. Pastoureau).

In 1950, Henri Rolland suggested that the origin of the Occitan cross be traced back to the marquisate of Provence, north of the Durance, more precisely the town of Venasque.

In 1966, in the L'Auta review, Roger Camboulives voices his idea that the Occitan cross derives from a sun cross and perhaps the Nestorian cross found in China's Turkestan. It would have arrived in Toulouse via northern Italy and Provence, probably sometime in the 10th century. Camboulives in 1980  again emphasizes the role played by the Visigoths in the presence of small spheres at the end of the arms of the cross: they could represent the twelve houses of the zodiac.

In 1986, Jean-Yves Royer (in Le Pays de Forcalquier) claims that the cross was originally from Provence but admits that Henri Rolland's theory was flawed and built around wrong dates. Royer concludes that Rolland possibly mistook the Occitan cross with that of Forcalquier. 
He draws evidence most notably from two crosses carved in the lid of a sarcophagus found in the small Alpes-de-Haute-Provence commune of Ganagobie.

Air Toulouse adopted the Occitan cross as trademark until mid-1990s.

Pierre Saliès in 1994 once again maintains that the cross is from Toulouse and is the fruit of successive local evolutions, possibly from the Jerusalem cross.

Two years after, in L'Auta (#612), Jean Rocacher confirms that the Occitan cross "is first the own emblem of the old county of Venasque, later torn between the houses of Toulouse and Forcalquier."

In 2000, Laurent Macé (in Les Comtes de Toulouse et leur entourage) claims that the Occitan cross became the counts' emblem after Raymond IV took part in the First Crusade. It would originate from Constantinople.
Macé indicates that its pattern was first found in the Byzantine area and spread across Western Europe through Italy and Provence. The crosses of Venasque and Forcalquier would thus share the same origin, though one was not inspired by the other.

Later in the same year, Bertran de la Farge (in La Croix occitane) locates the original Occitan cross somewhere in the marquisate of Provence, probably Venasque. He argues it could be a mixture of the Constantinople cross and the Coptic cross, which was brought to Provence by monks and maybe also through Saint Maurice.

Modern uses

The Occitan cross can be found on a number of flags, coats of arms, emblems and logos. Here follows a non-exhaustive list of occurrences:

Regions and provinces
 Flag of Languedoc-Roussillon
 Flag and emblem of Midi-Pyrénées
 Flag of the Aran Valley

Départements
 Coat of arms of Aude and the General Council of Aude
 Coat of arms of Gard
 Coat of arms of Hautes-Alpes
 Coat of arms of Haute-Garonne
 Coat of arms of Hérault
 Coat of arms of Tarn
 Coat of arms of Tarn-et-Garonne

Cities and towns

 Coat of arms of Ansignan
 Coat of arms of Buoux
 Coat of arms of Céreste
 Coat of arms of Colomiers
 Coat of arms of Fanjeaux
 Coat of arms of Gigondas
 Coat of arms of Laissac
 Coat of arms of Llupia
 Coat of arms of Méthamis
 Coat of arms of Moissac
 Coat of arms of Monclar (impaled)
 Coat of arms of Port-la-Nouvelle
 Coat of arms of Saint-Didier
 Coat of arms of Sévérac-le-Château
 Coat of arms of the City of Toulouse 
 Coat of arms of Travaillan
 Coat of arms of Venasque
 Flag of Vianne
 Coat of arms of Villeneuve-d'Aveyron
 Coat of arms of Villefranche-de-Lauragais
 Coat of arms of Villefranche-de-Rouergue

Miscellaneous
 Logo of Toulouse FC 
 Place du Capitole, Toulouse )
 Coat of arms of La Tour d'Auvergne
 Street signs in Toulouse
 Roadsigns in Limousin
 Sign of the Conseil Interprofessionnel des Vins du Languedoc

See also

Cercelée
Cross of Camargue

References 

 Les Comtes de Toulouse et leur entourage: Rivalités, alliances et jeux de pouvoir XIIe-XIIIe siècles by Laurent Macé (éd. Privat)
 La Croix occitane by Bertran de la Farge (éd. Loubatières)
 Le Pays de Forcalquier by Jean-Yves Royer (éd. Équinoxe)

External links

Cross symbols
Crosses in heraldry
Occitania
Occitania